"Kill the King" is a song by American thrash metal band Megadeth. The song was released as a single in 2000. It also received a music video in 2005.

Release and reception 
"Kill the King" first appeared on the compilations Capitol Punishment: The Megadeth Years, as one of two (or three, depending on the release) new songs included. and would later appear on Warchest, Greatest Hits: Back to the Start, and Anthology: Set the World Afire.

The song was praised by critics from Drowned In Sound, saying "Kill The King chugs along nicely on a basic but effective riff, then betas you repeatedly round the head with the chorus until you find yourself having withdrawal symptoms every time you turn it off. (It) deserve(s) to be on here, unlike the glorified B-sides which usually end up on these compilations." Critics from AllMusic also referred to it as, quote, "Solid".

Charts

Personnel
Megadeth
 Dave Mustaine – guitars, lead vocals
 David Ellefson – bass, backing vocals
 Jimmy DeGrasso – drums
 Al Pitrelli – guitars, backing vocals

References

Megadeth songs
2000 songs
2000 singles
Songs written by Dave Mustaine